Dr. T. Sadhan Tirumalaikumar is an Indian politician and a currently serving Member of the Legislative Assembly. He was elected to the Tamil Nadu legislative assembly  from Vasudevanallur constituency in 2006 election as a Marumalarchi Dravida Munnetra Kazhagam candidate. After he won 2nd place in Sankarankovil (State Assembly Constituency) by - poll elections were held in October 2013.

References 

Tamil Nadu politicians
Living people
National Democratic Alliance candidates in the 2014 Indian general election
Marumalarchi Dravida Munnetra Kazhagam politicians
Year of birth missing (living people)
Tamil Nadu MLAs 2021–2026